Armases is a genus of true crabs in the family Sesarmidae. There are about 13 described species in Armases.

Species
These 13 species belong to the genus Armases:

 Armases americanum (Saussure, 1858)
 Armases angustipes (Dana, 1852)
 Armases angustum (Smith, 1870)
 Armases benedicti (M. J. Rathbun, 1897)
 Armases cinereum (Bosc, 1802) (squareback marsh crab)
 Armases elegans (Herklots, 1851)
 Armases gorei (Abele, 1981)
 Armases magdalenense (Rathbun, 1918)
 Armases miersii (M. J. Rathbun, 1897)
 Armases occidentale (Smith, 1870)
 Armases ricordi (H. Milne Edwards, 1853)
 Armases roberti (H.Milne Edwards, 1853)
 Armases rubripes (Rathbun, 1897)

References

Further reading

External links

 

Decapods
Articles created by Qbugbot